Jankamrah (also spelled Jen Kamrah) is a village in northern Syria located west of Homs in the Homs Governorate. According to the Syria Central Bureau of Statistics, Jankamrah had a population of 1,514 in the 2004 census. Its inhabitants are predominantly Christians and Alawites.

References

Bibliography

 

Populated places in Talkalakh District
Alawite communities in Syria
Eastern Orthodox Christian communities in Syria